Universidad, located in Rio Piedras, is one of the 18 barrios of the municipality of San Juan, Puerto Rico. 

It originally belonged to the municipality of Río Piedras. When Río Piedras was annexed to San Juan in 1951, Río Piedras's barrio Universidad became one of San Juan's barrios. Universidad is notable for being the location of the main campus of the University of Puerto Rico at Río Piedras. The underground section of the Tren Urbano with the Universidad station is located below Ponce de León Avenue, to the west of the neighborhood.

Demographics
In 2010, Universidad had a population of 2,515.

Subbarrios
Universidad is divided into the following four subbarrios:
Amparo
Auxilio Mutuo
Institución
Valencia

Notable event
On October 14, 2019, the Ernesto Ramos Antonini public housing residence (located near the university) was the scene of a mass shooting, with more than 1000 shots fired with six people dead. Puerto Rico has struggled with escalating criminality, mainly due to the illegal drug trade.

See also
 List of communities in Puerto Rico

References

 
Barrios of San Juan, Puerto Rico